Sergei Igorevich Loginov (4 September 1963 – 23 May 2022) was a Russian professional footballer who played as a defender or midfielder.

Honours
Dinaburg
Latvian Football Cup finalist: 2001

References

1963 births
2022 deaths
Soviet footballers
Russian footballers
Association football defenders
Association football midfielders
Russian Premier League players
FC Dynamo Saint Petersburg players
FC Dynamo Bryansk players
FC Tekstilshchik Kamyshin players
FC Zenit Saint Petersburg players
FC Saturn Ramenskoye players
FC Znamya Truda Orekhovo-Zuyevo players
Dinaburg FC players
Russian expatriate footballers
Russian expatriate sportspeople in Latvia
Expatriate footballers in Latvia